Matteo Donati and Stefano Napolitano were the defending champions, but Donati did not participate. Napolitano partnered with Lorenzo Sonego, but they lost to Andrea Arnaboldi and Hans Podlipnik-Castillo in the quarterfinals.

Arnaboldi and Podlipnik-Castillo won the title, defeating Sergey Betov and Michail Elgin 6–7(5–7), 7–5, [10–3] in the final.

Seeds

Draw

References
 Main Draw

Citta di Vercelli - Trofeo Multimed - Doubles
2015 Doubles